The Whole Truth is a political thriller novel written by David Baldacci. This is the first book to feature A. Shaw and Katie James. The book was initially published on April 22, 2008 by Grand Central Publishing.

See also
Mutually assured destruction
Perception management

References

External links

2008 American novels
Novels by David Baldacci